Alexander Kahn (May 31, 1881 – March 11, 1962) was an American lawyer and newspaper publisher.

Early life and education 
Kahn was born on May 31, 1881 in Smolensk, Russia, the son of Solomon and B. Lena Ben Zionoff. He immigrated to America in 1893.

In 1903, Kahn graduated from New York University School of Law with an LL.B. and was admitted to the bar.

Law practice 
From 1903 to 1905, he was an assistant to a faculty member of the law school. He began practicing law in 1905.

Community work 
From 1916 to 1918, he was chairman of the People's Relief Committee, which raised seven million dollars for war sufferers. In 1919, he became a member of the executive board of the Hebrew Sheltering and Immigrant Aid Society of America. In 1929, he was appointed a non-Zionist representative of the administration committee of the American representative of the Jewish Agency for Palestine. He was also a vice-chairman of the American Jewish Joint Distribution Committee and a director of the American Jewish Joint Agricultural Corporation and the American Society for Jewish Farm Settlements in Russia. He was also a director of the Workmen's Circle and a corporation officer of the WEVD radio station.

Socialist party and trade unions 
Kahn was active in the Socialist Party and the trade union movement as a worker and speaker since 1897. In 1923, he became a director of the Rand School of Social Science and chairman of the New Leader Association (which published The New Leader). In 1924, he joined the executive committee of the Conference for Progressive Political Action. He wrote articles for the Jewish Daily Forward and the Jewish Worker. In 1914, he became vice-president of the Forward Association, which published the Forward. He was also general counsel of the Forward Association since 1903. In 1939, he became general manager of the Forward. He retired as general manager a few weeks before his death. He was known as "the East Side Ambassador to the Uptown Jews" due to his contributions in bringing the views of immigrant Jews to American Jewish leaders that knew little about the former's mentality.

Israel 
Deeply interested in Labor Zionism, he visited Israel with his wife shortly after the country's founding and was honored by Histadrut. He was a personal friend of Yitzhak Ben-Zvi and David Ben-Gurion. In 1961, the Israeli government presented him with a silver-bound Bible for his work on behalf of the Israel Bond Organization in America.

Politics 
In 1922, Kahn was a Socialist Party candidate for Justice of the New York Supreme Court. In 1931, he was the Socialist candidate for Brooklyn District Attorney, losing to Democrat William F. X. Geoghan. In the 1932 United States House of Representatives electionhe was the Socialist candidate in New York's 17th congressional district. He lost the election to Democrat Theodore A. Peyser. In the 1934 United States House of Representatives election, he was the Socialist candidate in New York's 7th congressional district. He lost the election to John J. Delaney. In the 1942 New York state election, he was the American Labor Party candidate for Attorney General of New York. He lost the election to Republican Nathaniel L. Goldstein. He was a founder and vice-president of the Liberal Party of New York, and unsuccessfully ran for office through that party.

Personal life 
In 1909, Kahn married Sarah Rosenbaum. Their children were Nora, Robert, and Jeanne. Sarah taught at the Educational Alliance in the Lower East Side and was chairman of the Women's division of the Rand School and president of the New York Council of Pioneer Women of the Women's Labor Zionist Organization of America. She died five months after Kahn.

Death 
Kahn died in New York Hospital on March 11, 1962. Mayor Robert F. Wagner, Jewish Labor Committee chairman Adolph Held, New York Supreme Court Justice Matthew M. Levy, Federal Judge Paul R. Hays, the Forward's acting editor Dr. Lazar Fogelman, Joint Distribution Committee executive vice-chairman Moses A. Leavitt, Israel Bond Organization executive vice-president Dr. Joseph J. Schwartz, Workmen's Circle leader Nathan Chanin, and Liberal Party president Alexander Rose all spoke at his funeral. He was buried in the Workmen's Circle section of Mount Carmel Cemetery.

References

External links 

 The Political Graveyard

1881 births
1962 deaths
20th-century American lawyers
American Zionists
American people of Russian-Jewish descent
Emigrants from the Russian Empire to the United States
Jewish American attorneys
Jewish American community activists
Jewish American trade unionists
Jews from the Russian Empire
Lawyers from New York City
Liberal Party of New York politicians
New York University School of Law alumni
People from Smolensk
People from Smolensky Uyezd
Socialist Party of America politicians from New York (state)
Burials in New York (state)